WAKW (93.3 FM, "Star 93.3") is a contemporary Christian music radio station located in Cincinnati, Ohio. It is a listener-supported radio station owned by Pillar of Fire International. The Class B, 50,000-watt signal reaches the greater Cincinnati area, including Northern Kentucky and Eastern Indiana.
The station plays a Christian adult contemporary format. It broadcasts with an effective radiated power of 50,000 watts.

History
In 1959, during the tenure of Dr. Johannes Maas as pastor of the Pillar of Fire Church and principal of Eden Grove Academy in Cincinnati, he envisioned starting a radio station similar to the Zarephath station, WAWZ, where he had served on the staff. He contacted Rev. Russell Croucher, the manager and chief technician at WAWZ, and together they made plans that led to the application to the FCC for a new FM station to be located on the Eden Grove Academy campus.  The application was approved in 1961. In honor of the leadership and counsel of Bishop White, the call letters of the new station were named after his initials, WAKW.

WAKW began broadcasting in 1961. While the call letters have remained the same the station has been known by many different names, including Majesty 93 and New Life 93.  In March 2008, WAKW rebranded as Star 93.3 to unify its branding with WAWZ.

References

External links

Pillar of Fire International
AKW
Contemporary Christian radio stations in the United States
Radio stations established in 1959
AKW